Robert John Grant (born 28 July 1965) is a former English cricketer. Grant was a right-handed batsman who bowled right-arm medium pace. He was born in Leamington Spa, Warwickshire.

Grant made his debut for Staffordshire in the 1989 MCCA Knockout Trophy against Cheshire. Grant played Minor counties cricket for Staffordshire from 1989 to 1990, playing a further MCCA Knockout Trophy match against Shropshire in 1990, while having made a single Minor Counties Championship appearance in 1989 against Bedfordshire. In 1989, he made his List A debut against Glamorgan in the NatWest Trophy. He played a further List A match against Northamptonshire in the 1990 NatWest Trophy. In his two List A matches, Grant did not score any runs and bowled 24 wicket-less overs.

References

External links

1965 births
Living people
Sportspeople from Leamington Spa
English cricketers
Staffordshire cricketers